Pleuromeiaceae is an extinct family of plants related to living quillworts (Isoetes), in the order Isoetales but with tall stems and terminal compact cones. They were especially widespread globally during the Early and Middle Triassic in the aftermath of the Permian-Triassic mass extinction.

References

Prehistoric plant families
Prehistoric lycophytes